Michelle Bonae Finn-Burrell (born May 8, 1965 in Orlando, Florida) is an American former sprint athlete from Orlando, Florida. She graduated from Oak Ridge High School in Orlando.  She set the Florida State University record for the 100 meters which has lasted over 18 years into the 2006 season. She won a gold medal at the 1992 Barcelona Olympics as part of the 4 × 100 meters relay team (heats). She also reached the final of the 200 meters at the same event, finishing in seventh place. In 1993 Finn was a 100 and 200 m semi-finalist at the World Championships and took the bronze medal at the US national championships for the 200 m.

She ran on the United States gold medal-winning 4 × 100 m relay team in the 1986 Goodwill Games in Moscow. She spread her All-America performances over all four years of her FSU career beginning with the 100 meters as a freshman in 1984 through All-America honors in the 55, 100, 200 and with the 4 × 100 m relay team at the 1987 NCAA Championships. Finn was the 1990 TAC/USA's National Indoor Champion. She competed in the IAAF World Indoor Championships three times, reaching the final of the 60 meters twice.

She married Leroy Burrell, American sprinter, who broke the world 100 m record twice, 9.90s (1991) and 9.85s (1994). They have three sons Cameron, Joshua and Jaden.

Personal bests

References

External links
 
 
 

1965 births
Living people
Track and field athletes from Florida
Sportspeople from Orlando, Florida
American female sprinters
African-American female track and field athletes
Olympic gold medalists for the United States in track and field
Athletes (track and field) at the 1992 Summer Olympics
World Athletics Championships athletes for the United States
World Athletics Championships medalists
Florida State Seminoles women's track and field athletes
Medalists at the 1992 Summer Olympics
Athletes (track and field) at the 1987 Pan American Games
Pan American Games gold medalists for the United States
Pan American Games medalists in athletics (track and field)
Universiade medalists in athletics (track and field)
Goodwill Games medalists in athletics
Universiade gold medalists for the United States
USA Outdoor Track and Field Championships winners
USA Indoor Track and Field Championships winners
Competitors at the 1986 Goodwill Games
Competitors at the 1990 Goodwill Games
Medalists at the 1987 Pan American Games
Olympic female sprinters
21st-century African-American people
21st-century African-American women
20th-century African-American sportspeople
20th-century African-American women